The 70th edition of the KNVB Cup started on October 7, 1987. The final was played on May 12, 1988: PSV beat Roda JC 3–2 and won the cup for the fourth time.

Teams
 All 18 participants of the Eredivisie 1987-88
 All 19 participants of the Eerste Divisie 1987-88
 26 teams from lower (amateur) leagues
 One youth team

First round
The matches of the first round were played between October 7 and 13, 1987.

E Eredivisie; 1 Eerste Divisie; A Amateur teams

Second round
The matches of the second round were played on November 14 and 15, 1987.

Round of 16
The matches of the round of 16 were played on February 10, 12, 14 and March 30, 1988.

Quarter finals
The quarter finals were played on April 13, 1988.

Semi-finals
The semi-finals were played on April 26, 1988.

Final

PSV also won the Dutch Eredivisie championship, thereby taking the double. They would participate in the European Cup, so Roda JC could play in the Cup Winners' Cup.

See also
 1987–88 Eredivisie
 1987–88 Eerste Divisie

External links
 Netherlands Cup Full Results 1970–1994 by the RSSSF

1987-88
1987–88 domestic association football cups
1987–88 in Dutch football